Sören Bartol (born 4 September 1974) is a German politician of the Social Democratic Party (SPD) who has been serving as Parliamentary State Secretary in the Federal Ministry for Housing, Urban Development and Building in the coalition government of Chancellor Olaf Scholz since 2021. He has been a member of the German Parliament since 2002.

Political career
Bartol has been a member of the German Bundestag since the 2002 federal election, representing the electoral district of Marburg.

In the negotiations to form a Grand Coalition of Chancellor Angela Merkel's Christian Democrats (CDU together with the Bavarian CSU) and the SPD following the 2013 federal elections, Bartol was part of the SPD delegation in the working group on transport, building and infrastructure, led by Peter Ramsauer and Florian Pronold.

From 2013 until 2021, Bartol served as deputy chairman of the SPD parliamentary group under the leadership of successive chairpersons Thomas Oppermann (2013–2017), Andrea Nahles (2017–2019) and Rolf Mützenich (2019–2021). In the negotiations to form a fourth coalition government under Merkel following the 2017 federal elections, he again led the working group on transport and infrastructure, this time alongside Thomas Strobl and Alexander Dobrindt.

Bartol is a member of the Parliamentary Friendship Group for Relations with the States of Central America, the Parliamentary Friendship Group for Relations with the States of South America – which is in charge of maintaining inter-parliamentary relations with Argentina, Bolivia, Chile, Ecuador, Guyana, Colombia, Paraguay, Peru, Suriname, Uruguay, Venezuela – and the German-Brazilian Parliamentary Friendship Group.

Other activities

Corporate boards
 KfW, ex-officio Member of the Board of Supervisory Directors (since 2018)
 INOSOFT AG, Member of the Supervisory Board (-2013)

Non-profit organizations
 Business Forum of the Social Democratic Party of Germany, Member of the Political Advisory Board (since 2020)
 Evangelical Church of Hesse Electorate-Waldeck School Foundation, Member of the Board (since 2005)
 Gegen Vergessen – Für Demokratie, Member
 Federal Foundation of Baukultur, Member of the Board of Trustees (2009-2012)
 Federal Network Agency for Electricity, Gas, Telecommunications, Post and Railway (BNetzA), Member of the Rail Infrastructure Advisory Council (2009-2014)
 German United Services Trade Union (ver.di), Member

References

External links 
  
 Bundestag biography 

1974 births
Living people
Politicians from Hamburg
German Protestants
University of Marburg alumni
Members of the Bundestag for Hesse
Members of the Bundestag 2021–2025
Members of the Bundestag 2017–2021
Members of the Bundestag 2013–2017
Members of the Bundestag 2009–2013
Members of the Bundestag 2005–2009
Members of the Bundestag 2002–2005
Members of the Bundestag for the Social Democratic Party of Germany